Lao Lishi (born December 12, 1987 in Zhanjiang, Guangdong) is a female diver from the People's Republic of China.

Lao represented China at the 2004 Summer Olympics, earning a silver medal in the 10 meter women's platform and a gold medal in women's 10 meter synchronized platform along with Li Ting.

See also 
Diving at the 2004 Summer Olympics

References

1987 births
Living people
Chinese female divers
Divers at the 2004 Summer Olympics
Olympic divers of China
Olympic gold medalists for China
Olympic silver medalists for China
People from Zhanjiang
Olympic medalists in diving
Asian Games medalists in diving
Sportspeople from Guangdong
Divers at the 2002 Asian Games
Medalists at the 2004 Summer Olympics
World Aquatics Championships medalists in diving
Asian Games gold medalists for China
Medalists at the 2002 Asian Games
Universiade medalists in diving
Universiade gold medalists for China
Medalists at the 2007 Summer Universiade
Medalists at the 2009 Summer Universiade
21st-century Chinese women